Sir Thomas Thynne (c.1610 – 1669) was an English lawyer and politician who sat in the House of Commons in 1660.

Life
Thynne was the second surviving son of Sir Thomas Thynne and his first wife Maria Tuchet, daughter of Lord Audley. His parent's marriage was disputed and there was a long legal dispute. Thynne matriculated at Magdalen Hall, Oxford on 28 June 1620, aged 10. He entered Middle Temple in 1629 and was called to the bar in 1637. He was knighted on 19 August 1642  but appears to have taken no part in the Civil War;. In 1646  he was assessed at £4,000 by the committee for the advance of money, but no proceedings were taken. His house at Richmond, Surrey was searched for royalist suspects in 1659 and his steward and butler were ordered to be arrested.

In 1660, Thynne was elected Member of Parliament for Hindon in a double return and was admitted to the Convention Parliament on the merits of his election. He was commissioner for assessment for Wiltshire from August 1660 to 1661, commissioner for  sewers for  Bedford level from 1662 to 1663, commissioner for assessment for Surrey from 1663 and commissioner for assessment for Gloucestershire from 1665.

Thynne may have died aged 59 soon after 14 October 1669, when he dictated a codicil to his will which he was unable to sign.

Thynne married Stuarta Balcanquhall, daughter of Walter Balcanquhall, DD, Dean of Durham on 6 September 1642. He was succeeded by his son Thomas. The elder Thomas pre-deceased his elder brother Sir James Thynne from whom his son Thomas inherited the vast estate at Longleat, but who was assassinated in 1682, while in his coach in Pall Mall.

References

1610 births
1669 deaths
Thomas
English MPs 1660
Alumni of Magdalen Hall, Oxford
Members of the Middle Temple
People from Wiltshire
People from Richmond, London
People from Gloucestershire